Item One is a 1956 Bulgarian drama film directed by Boyan Danovski. It was entered into the 1956 Cannes Film Festival.

Cast
 Rumyana Chokoyska - Veska
 Zheni Bozhinova - Veska's mother
 Ruzha Delcheva - the chairwoman
 Konstantin Kisimov - Barmaley
 Asen Ruskov - Maestroto
 Veselin Boyadzhiev - Uragan
 Hristo Hranov - Shishko
 Dimo Bakalov - Kircho
 Stefan Dimitrov - Vladko
 Panayot Mihaylov - Vasich
 Ivan Bratanov - the chimney-sweeper
 Ivan Tonev - the workman
 Rangel Vulchanov -

References

External links

1956 films
Bulgarian-language films
1956 drama films
Bulgarian drama films